The flaccid catshark (Apristurus exsanguis) is a catshark of the family Scyliorhinidae. It is endemic to the waters around New Zealand.

Distribution 
This species is found only around New Zealand, although this species' collection records indicate it is widespread and probably continuously distributed over the mid- to lower slope around New Zealand. The biology of all Apristurus species within the New Zealand Exclusive Economic Zone is very poorly known due to the uncertain taxonomy of the group. They appear to be most abundant below 1,000 m, and are the only sharks regularly taken in research trawls below 1,200 m on the Chatham Rise. As relatively little fishing occurs below 1,200 m, a large part of their population may be effectively beyond fishing depths.

Conservation status 
The New Zealand Department of Conservation has classified the flaccid catshark as "Data deficient" under the New Zealand Threat Classification System.

References

External links
 Image of Apristurus exsanguis specimen held at National Museum of New Zealand Te Papa Tongarewa

Apristurus
Endemic marine fish of New Zealand
Taxa named by Keiichi Sato (ichthyologist)
Taxa named by Kazuhiro Nakaya
Taxa named by Andrew L. Stewart
Fish described in 1999